Golden Lion or Golden Lyon may refer to:

Golden Lion, the highest prize given to a film at the Venice Film Festival
Golden Lion (St Ives, Cambridgeshire public house), a pub in St Ives, Cambridgeshire, England
Golden Lion, Fulham, a pub and former music venue in London 
The Golden Lion, an Italian fairy tale
Golden Lions, a South African rugby team
Golden Lion FC, a Martinican football team.
Golden Lions (parachute display team), the Scottish Infantry parachute display team
A gold coin issued by the United States of Belgium (1790)
Golden Lion (novel), a 2015 book by Wilbur Smith in The Courtney Novels series
Dutch ship Gouden Leeuw (Golden Lion), Dutch flagship at the Battle of Texel (1673) 
 Golden Lion (St. Paul's Churchyard) (aka Golden Lyon), a historical bookseller in London
Golden Lion, Port Isaac, a pub in Cornwall, England

See also
Golden Lion Stadium, a multi-purpose stadium in Pine Bluff, Arkansas, United States
Golden lion tamarin, a small New World monkey of the family Callitrichidae
Golden Lions (disambiguation)